Ultrasound-modulated optical tomography (UOT) is a form of tomography involving ultrasound. It is used in imaging of biological soft tissues and has potential applications for early cancer detection. Like optical techniques, this method provides high contrast, and the use of ultrasound also provides high resolution.

Advantage 
Compared to traditional optical technology, UOT provides sufficient penetration depth. UOT relies on all the photons within deep tissue. No matter how many times photons are scattered, as long as they are not absorbed, those photons are still useful for UOT. By applying this method, it is possible to generate images at quasi-diffusive or diffusive layer for biological tissue.

Basic Concepts 
UOT basically built upon the modulation of light due to ultrasonic wave effect happened within testing medium. The target within the testing medium will be irradiated by a laser beam and a focused ultrasonic wave. The reemitted light propagating through ultrasonic wave will then carry information of local optical and acoustic properties. These properties will be used to regenerate images showing the inside view of the medium.

Mechanisms 
There are three important mechanisms behind UOT technology.

1 Incoherent Modulation of Light Due to Ultrasound-Induced Variations in Optical Properties of Medium.  This mechanism mainly describes that as the ultrasonic wave propagates through the medium, the mass density of the medium will be changed due to the vibration. This variation in mass density will then influence the local optical properties. For example, the local absorption coefficient, scattering coefficient, and the index of refraction will all be modulated. With different optical properties, the reemitted light features (like intensity) will be modified.

2 Variations in Optical Phase in Response to Ultrasound-Induced Displacements of Scatterers. This mechanism mainly describes the effect in a microcosmic view. With the vibration from focused ultrasound, the local scatterers within the medium will be moved. When coherent light passes through such region, the displacement of scatterers will then cause optical phases change and then further modulate the light's free-path lengths. In the end, the reemitted light will form speckle pattern.

3 Variations in Optical Phase in Response to Ultrasonic Modulation of Index of Refraction of Background Medium.  Similar to the second mechanism, the mass density modulation caused by ultrasonic wave vibration will also modulate the medium's index of refraction. This effect can further influence the free-path phases when light passes through the ultrasonic region and form a speckle pattern. 

In conclusion, the three mechanisms mainly describes that the ultrasonic wave can modulate and fluctuate the light intensity (in mechanism 1), the light phase and form speckle pattern (mechanism 2 and 3). These three mechanisms are the fundamental knowledge applied to build UOT system. Something more to mention, in these three mechanisms, only the first one does not require coherent light source. Mechanism 2 and 3 do require light coherence.

UOT analytic model 
In analytic model, two approximations are made. (1) the optical wavelength is much shorter than the mean free path (weak-scattering approximation) and (2) the ultrasound-induced change in the optical path length is much less than the optical wavelength (weak-modulation approximation).  

With the first approximation, we can assume the ensemble-averaged correlations between electric fields are the same. Since the differences between correlation results from different paths are negligible. With this assumption, the correlations for electric fields G1(ꚍ) can be written as the following:

In this equation the parenthesis represents the ensemble and time averaging. Es demsontrates the unit-amplitude electric field of the scattered light of a path of length s, and p(s) denotes the probability density function of s. In analytic UOT model, we treat the light source as an optical plane wave. We assume the plane wave light normally hit a slab of thickness d. The transmitted light will be captured by a point detector. After applying diffusion theory, the original G1 equation can be further modified as:

Where                                            

In these equations, ωa represents the acoustic angular frequency, and the n0 is the background index of refraction; k0 is the magnitude of the optical wave vector in vacuo;  A is the acoustic amplitude, which is proportional to the acoustic pressure; ka is the magnitude of the acoustic wavevector; lt' is the optical transport mean free path; η is the elasto-optical coefficient; ρ is the mass density;  represents how ultrasound averagely change the light per free path via index of refraction and displacementare respectively.

After deriving the autocorrelation equation, Wiener-Khinchin theorem is applied. With this theorem, we can further connect G1 with the spectral density of the modulated speckle. Their relationship in frequency space is shown as the following Fourier transformation equation.

For simplicity, the Fourier transformed term  exp(-iω0t)  is dropped, and the ω here represents relative angular frequency of unmodulated light. For example, if  ω=0 this equation is calculating the spectral density with absolute angular frequency  ω0. Since G1 is an even autocorrelation function, the spectral intensity at ωa can be written as:

Here, the n and Ta represent the acoustic period. Since the frequency spectrum is symmetric about ω0, the one side modulation depth is defined as:

Then we can consider the condition under the second approximation (weak-modulation approximation). In this situation, the term   is much smaller than 1. By applying the feature of sinh function, which is the main component of G1 function, the original autocorrelation G1 can be further simplified as:

From previous equation, we can see . Therefore, in conclusion, A and M1 has quadratic relationship. Such quadratic modulation can be captured by a Fabry-Perot interferometer. Or, we can calculate the ratio between observed AC signal and he observed DC signal (also named as apparent modulation depth) which can carry enough information to represent such modulation as well. 

In conclusion, in UOT analytic model, with the help of weak-scattering approximation, weak-modulation approximation, diffusion theory, and Wiener-Khinchin theorem, the relationship between acoustic amplitude and modulated light can be successfully observed.

Time-Resolved Frequency-Swept UOT (Forward model) 
For single-frequency UOT, the axial resolution along ultrasonic axis is always limited by the elongated ultrasonic focal zone. To improve the axial resolution, Ultrasonic frequency-swept UOT model is designed. In this system, the object is placed in a tank full of UOT scattering medium. There will also be an ultrasound absorber at the bottom of the tank to avoid rebound of ultrasound. Basically, a function generator will produce a frequency signal relating to time. After passing through a power amplifier and a transformer, such frequency command will be sent to the ultrasonic transducer to generate ultrasonic beam with different frequencies. After a brief calculation, a focused ultrasonic beam will be sent to the medium and the target. Meanwhile, a laser beam which is perpendicular to the ultrasonic beam will also illuminate the scattering medium. Then, on the other side of the light source, the PMT, modulated by frequency signal sent through the first function generator will detect transmitted light signal within the tank and transfer the optical signal to electrical signal. The electrical signal will then pass through an amplifier, an Oscilloscope and be stored in the data base.

With such data base, spectral intensity vs frequency plots at multiple points can be generated (The first spectrum is generated as a reference, produced by optical signal far from the object.). Each of the spectrum can then be further converted to a 1D image showing the interior of the medium in the direction perpendicualr to the tank (z direction). In the end, all the 1D image will be pieced together to generate a full view inside the medium.

In summary, a frequency-swept (chirped) ultrasonic wave can encode laser light traversing the acoustic axis with various frequencies. Decoding the transmitted light provides resolution along the acoustic axis. This scheme is analogous to MRI.

Development
Was first proposed as a method for virus detection in 2013.

References
Tomography
Optical imaging
Medical ultrasonography